Jefferson Township is a township in Linn County, in the U.S. state of Missouri.

Jefferson Township was established in 1845, and most likely named after President Thomas Jefferson.

References

Townships in Missouri
Townships in Linn County, Missouri